Frank Thistlethwaite CBE (24 July 1915 – 17 February 2003) was an English academic who served as the first vice-chancellor of the University of East Anglia.

Early life
Thistlethwaite was born on 24 July 1915 at 11 Powell Street, Burnley, Lancashire, the elder son of Lee Thistlethwaite (1885–1973), cotton cloth merchant and manufacturer, and his wife Florence Nightingale née Thornber (1892–1983), youngest child of Sharp Thornber (1858–1933), cotton manufacturer, alderman and J.P., and Florence Nightingale (m. 1883; 1859–1917). He was initially educated at Burnley Grammar School, before attending Bootham School, York, and then St John's College, Cambridge (MA), and at the University of Minnesota.

Career
Thistlethwaite served in the RAF 1941–45, during which time he was seconded to work for the War Cabinet 1942–45. A fellow of St John's College, Cambridge, Thistlethwaite served as a lecturer in the Faculty of Economics and Politics at the University of Cambridge from 1949 to 1961. He was founding chairman of the British Association for American Studies (1955–59). He became the first vice-chancellor of the University of East Anglia in 1961 and remained the post until 1980. He was appointed a CBE in 1979.

Publications
The Great Experiment: An Introduction to the History of the American People (1955)
The Anglo-American Connection in the Early Nineteenth Century (1958)
Dorset Pilgrims: The Story of West Country Puritans who went to New England in the 17th Century (1989)
A Lancashire Family Inheritance (1996)
Our War 1938–45 (1997)

References

External links
Frank Thistlethwaite Archive, University of East Anglia

1915 births
People educated at Burnley Grammar School
People educated at Bootham School
Alumni of St John's College, Cambridge
Fellows of St John's College, Cambridge
University of Minnesota alumni
Academics of the University of Cambridge
Vice-Chancellors of the University of East Anglia
Academics of the University of East Anglia
Commanders of the Order of the British Empire
Royal Air Force personnel of World War II
2003 deaths
People from Burnley